Ayvora (also Romanized as Ayvorā, Eyvarā‘, and Īvarā‘; also known as Abūrā‘) is a village in Chaharduli Rural District, in the Central District of Asadabad County, Hamadan Province, Iran. At the 2006 census, its population was 400, in 86 families.

References 

Populated places in Asadabad County